Fletcher Bath Wade (September 9, 1852 in Granville, Nova Scotia – May 23, 1905) was a Canadian politician and barrister. He was elected to the House of Commons of Canada in 1900 as a member of the Liberal Party to represent the riding of Annapolis.

External links 
 

1852 births
1905 deaths
Liberal Party of Canada MPs
Members of the House of Commons of Canada from Nova Scotia